Marvin Chinchilla Calderón (born 11 February 1977) is a Costa Rican football player who currently plays for Puma Generaleña in the Costa Rican Primera División.

Club career
He played for several Costa Rica top-tier clubs, such as Pérez Zeledón, Alajuelense, Cartaginés and Liberia.

When Chinchilla was dismissed at Santos de Guápiles, he joined UCR in summer 2008 and then decided to start his own club with his brothers and bought the licence of second division side El Roble in 2009 to found Puma Generaleña for whom he became the club captain.

International career
He played at the 1997 FIFA World Youth Championship, but never played for the senior Costa Rica national football team.

He also played in the football tournament of 1998 Central American and Caribbean Games

Honours and awards
Copa Interclubes UNCAF 2001

References

External links
Stats. at 2007-08 season

1977 births
Living people
Association football forwards
Costa Rican footballers
Municipal Pérez Zeledón footballers
L.D. Alajuelense footballers
C.S. Cartaginés players
Municipal Liberia footballers
Santos de Guápiles footballers
Liga FPD players
C.F. Universidad de Costa Rica footballers